Chloroselas overlaeti is a butterfly in the family Lycaenidae. It is found in the Democratic Republic of the Congo (from the south-eastern part of the country to Lualaba), Zambia and Tanzania (from the western part of the country to Mpanda and Kigoma).

References

Butterflies described in 1956
Chloroselas